2009 U.S. Open may refer to:
2009 U.S. Open (golf), a major golf tournament
2009 US Open (tennis), a Grand Slam tennis tournament
2009 Lamar Hunt U.S. Open Cup, a soccer tournament for U.S. teams
2009 US Open Darts